The name Mindy has been used for two tropical cyclones in the Atlantic Ocean. 

 Tropical Storm Mindy (2003),  remained at sea, but caused minor damage in Puerto Rico.
 Tropical Storm Mindy (2021), made landfall in Florida, weakening to a tropical depression shortly after; the precursor disturbance triggered deadly flooding in Mexico, killing 23 people.

Atlantic hurricane set index articles